Rhabdolona strandi is a species of beetle in the family Buprestidae, the only species in the genus Rhabdolona.

References

Monotypic Buprestidae genera